Muhammad al-Nasir (al-Nāṣir li-dīn Allāh Muḥammad ibn al-Manṣūr,  – 1213) was the fourth Almohad Caliph from 1199 until his death. Contemporary Christians referred to him as Miramamolin.          

On 25 January 1199, al-Nasir's father Abu Yusuf Yaqub al-Mansur died; al-Nasir was proclaimed the new caliph that very day. Al-Nasir inherited from his father an empire that was showing signs of instability. Because of his father's victories against the Christians in the Iberian Peninsula (Al-Andalus), he was temporarily relieved from serious threats on that front and able to concentrate on combating and defeating Banu Ghaniya attempts to seize Ifriqiya (Tunisia). Needing, after this, to deal with problems elsewhere in the empire, he appointed Abu Mohammed ibn Abi Hafs as governor of Ifriqiya, so unwittingly inaugurating the rule of the Hafsid dynasty there, which lasted until 1574.

Dynasty and Iberian presence
He now had to turn his attention back to Iberia, to deal with a Crusade proclaimed by Pope Innocent III at the request of King Alfonso VIII of Castile. This resulted in his defeat by a Christian coalition at the Battle of Las Navas de Tolosa (1212). He died the following year, and was succeeded by his young son Yusuf al-Mustansir, born of Christian slave Qamar.

Relationship with King John of England
In the early 13th century, John, King of England was under pressure after a quarrel with Pope Innocent III led to England being placed under an interdict, by which all forms of worship and other religious practices were banned. John himself was excommunicated, parts of the country were in revolt and there were threats of a French invasion.

Writing two decades after the events, Matthew Paris, a St Albans chronicler of the early thirteenth century, claims that, in desperation, John sent envoys to al-Nâsir asking for his help. In return John offered to convert to Islam, to make the country at disposal of the caliph and turn England into a Muslim state. Among the delegates was Master Robert, a London cleric. Al-Nâsir was said to be so disgusted by John's grovelling plea that he sent the envoys away. Historians have cast doubt on this story, due to the lack of other contemporary evidence.

Viziers
Abu Zayd bin Yujan (1198–1199)
Abu Mohammed ibn Abi Hafs (1199–1205), the future governor of Ifriqiya (see above)
Abu Sa`id Uthman ibn Jam`i (1205–1214)

References

Bibliography
Charles-André Julien, Histoire de l'Afrique du Nord, des origines à 1830. 1931.

1213 deaths
13th-century people from al-Andalus
12th-century Almohad caliphs
13th-century Almohad caliphs
Year of birth unknown
12th-century Berber people
13th-century Berber people